Zaurbek Kazbekovich Sidakov (born 14 March 1996) is a Russian freestyle wrestler, who competes at 74 kilograms. Sidakov is reigning Olympic champion in the 74 kg and a two-time World Champion, claiming his titles in 2018 and 2019 by defeating the likes of five-time World and Olympic champion, Jordan Burroughs, two-time World Champion, Frank Chamizo and U23 World Champion, Avtandil Kentchadze.

Sidakov is also a European Games Gold medalist, World Cup champion, three-time Russian National Champion, two-time Ivan Yarygin International champion (four-time finalist, five-time medalist), Military World Champion and U23 European Champion (two-time finalist).

Beslan terrorist attack
On 1 September 2004, the school Sidakov attended – School no.1 in Beslan – was overtaken by Chechen terrorists in the Beslan school siege  , which resulted in over 1,100 victims being held hostage and 334 victims murdered over a three-day period where they would be  held in the school's gym-hall without any food or water.  Despite being children at the time, they understood what was happening when being evacuated from school, said Sidakov and he had friends and training partners who were being held as hostages. Artur Nayfonov, an Olympic Wrestling Champion, also survived the siege.

Wrestling career
Sidakov has won a multitudinous number of medals throughout his career; he has won bronze, two silvers and two gold medals at the Ivan Yarygin Golden Grand Prix from 2015 to 2019  – most recently, a gold at the Ivan Yarygin 2019. In 2016 he captured his first gold medal at the Grand Prix by defeating Russian National champion, Khusein Suyunchev.  Most recently in 2018, Zidakov entered at the quarter-final stage of the Ivan Yarygin Golden Grand Prix and wrestled Turkish wrestled Muhammet Demir and won by 13–2 technical fall, in the semi-final round; he faced fellow training partner and Ossetian, Khakhaber Khubezthy by 5–0, thus advancing to the final round.  Sidakov faced another training partner of his, Khetag Tsabolov and lost after giving up a last minute takedown, and lost by the score of 1–3, ultimately resulting in Sidakov taking the silver medal.

2018 Russian National Championships
Sidakov entered the 2018 Russian National Freestyle Wrestling Championships in Odintsovo, Moscow Oblast in August 2018.  In the round of 16, he defeated Konstantin Korolyov of Krasnoyarsk by 14–1 technical fall; Sidakov went on to defeat Magomed Magomedov of Moscow by 9–0 in the round of 8.  In the quarter-finals, Sidakov defeated Timur Bizhoev of Krasnodar by 3–1 and advanced to the semi-finals where he defeated Evgeny Lapishov of Tatarstan by 10–0 technical superiority, thus advancing Sidakov to the finals, where he would face former opponent and training partner, Khetag Tsabolov.  Sidakov ultimately got his revenge and the gold medal this time, as he won by 2–2 criteria scoring a takedown in the last 30 seconds.

2018 World Championships

Sidakov made his first appearance on the world stage when he entered the 2018 World Championships in Budapest, Hungary.  In Sidakov's opening match, he faced and defeated Bulgaria's Miroslav Kirov by 10–0 technical-fall, and then defeated Franklin Gomez to advance to the quarter-finals.  In the quarter-final, he beat NCAA champion, Olympic gold medalist and four-time world champion Jordan Burroughs 6–5, and Sidakov then beat Olympic Bronze medalist, and two-time European and World champion, Frank Chamizo by 3–2, advancing Sidakov to the final, opposite Georgia's Avtandil Kentchadze, a 2018 U23 European Championships Bronze Medalist – whom Sidakov defeated at the U23 Senior European Championships in the semi-final.  After a hard-fought match between Sidakov and Kentchadze, Sidakov won by the score of 2*-2; winning by criteria; the gold medal; first place on the podium and his first senior world title.

2019

In 2019, World Champion Sidakov returned to the annually held Ivan Yarygin tournament in Krasnoyarsk. Zaurbek stormed his way into the finals, where he wrestled against Yakup Gor of Turkey, whom he defeated 5–4 to capture the gold medal.

In March, Sidakov was part of the Russian team at the Freestyle Wrestling World Cup held in Yakutsk. Sidakov, who was part of the first team, faced four-time World Championships medalist, Geandry Garzon of Cuba, whom Sidakov quickly dispatched by fall as a result of a well-timed cradle from a defended single leg. In Sidakov's second match, he wrestled Iranian Reza Afzali, whom Sidakov defeated by 6–0. Russia would then go on to win the World Cup with a score of 9–1 against Iran.

European Games
Sidakov was then placed on the Russian squad to wrestle at the 2019 European Games held in the capital of Belarus, Minsk. Entering into the tournament, Sidakov first met rival Avtandil Kentchadze of Georgia, who he defeated by the score of 5–3. In the semi-finals, Sidakov faced Azamat Nurykau and defeated him by a score of 6–4. In the final, Sidakov wrestled with three-time European Champion and World medalist, Soner Demirtaş of Turkey. After a minute of hand-fighting, Sidakov would shoot a single-leg causing Demirtas to sprawl out, after turning away, Sidakov would lock in a cradle and would go on to pin Demirtaş, declaring Sidakov the victory by fall, giving Sidakov the gold medal at the European Games.

World Championships
At the 2019 World Championships, Sidakov first defeated Mexican representative, Victor Hernandez, by a technical fall, 10–0. He went on defeating Kamil Rybycki 8–0 and Mao Okui, Japanese Academic World medalist, in the quarter-finals by a score of 6–0. In the semi-finals, Sidakov faced four-time World Champion and former Olympic Champion, Jordan Burroughs – a rematch of the 2018 World Wrestling Championships quarter-finals – and won in the same fashion as he did in 2018, by a last-second step-out to score 4–3. In 2019, Sidakov once again defeated Burroughs with a last-second step-out and after a failed challenge for a score of 4–3.

In what would be a rematch of the 2018 World Championships semi-finals, Sidakov faced two-time World Champion, Frank Chamizo, in the final. Sidakov used his tie-ups and hand-fighting to control most of the match, leaving Chamizo without any scoring chances; Chamizo was put on the shot-clock giving Sidakov a one-point lead for passivity at the half-way point. In the second period, Chamizo found a way to a single leg takedown and finish it for two-points to lead by a score of 2–1. After being down, Sidakov almost immediately began applying more pressure and managed to get a takedown of his own around 20 seconds later; leading 3–2, in the last twenty seconds, he would land another brief two-point takedown and defended his world title by a score of 5–2, ultimately resulting in Sidakov become a two-time Wrestling World Champion.  Following his victory at the World Championships, Sidakov dedicated his victory to all those deceased as a result of the 2004 Beslan terrorist school attack.

2020

2020 Russian National Championships
Following the ongoing COVID-19 pandemic, many of the wrestling tournaments had been cancelled nationally and internationally; thus Sidakov's first tournament in over a year would be at the 2020 Russian National Freestyle Wrestling Championships.  In Sidakov's first match in over a year, he would suffer a shock upset defeat to teammate and friend, Khetag Tsabolov and lose 9–3; with Tsabolov reaching the final, Sidakov would be pulled into repechage.  Sidakov would be faced with Azamat Khadzaragov of the same republic (North Ossetia-Alania), Sidakov was the victor by technical fall, which would allow him to the chance to wrestle for one of the two bronze medals.  Opposite Sidakov, was 2016 world champion, Magomed Kurbanaliev, whom was defeated by the score of 9–1 – resulting in a bronze medal for Sidakov.

2021

2021 Russian National Championships
Following Sidakov's unsuccessful 2020 National championships run, he would return at the 2021 national championships held in Ulan-Ude, Buryatia.  Sidakov would start his run with a fall win over Khanty-Mansiysk's Tsyrenov, followed by a 4–0 shut-out against Dagestan representative Dzhaparov.   In the quarter-final, Sidakov would be matched up with Dagestan's Kurbanaliev, whom Sidakov defeated by the score of 5–3; the semi-final consisted of a match-up with Kabardino-Balkaria's Timur Bizhoev, which was a tightly fought match; ultimately decided by Sidakov's strong defense and ability to keep a lead with a 5–3 win.  In the final match, Sidakov faced Dagestan representative Razambek Zhamalov, who trains under the Saitiev brothers, in Khasavyurt.  In what would be the closest match of Sidakov's run, two push-outs were scored within the last 15 seconds, giving Sidakov a 2*-2 criteria lead, and a failed challenge from Zhamalov's team gave Sidakov the 3–2 win and his third Russian National title.  With the win at the 2021 Russian Nationals, Sidakov would be chosen to represent the Russian Olympic Committee at the Tokyo 2020 Olympics, which would be rescheduled for 2021, because of the ongoing pandemic.

2021 Sassari International Tournament
Almost two months prior to the start of the Olympic games, Sidakov and most of the Russian National team would be sent to the Sassari City International to gain some pre-Olympic experience; Sidakov would win the gold medal after winning his three matches by two tech-falls and a pin.

2020 Tokyo Olympics
With his gold medal and first place win at the 2021 Russian National Championships, Sidakov successfully qualified for the 2020 Summer Olympics held in Tokyo, with a third place seed.  On August 5, in the round of 8, Sidakov was matched up with former Olympian, Augusto Midana of Guinea-Bissau, who was defeated by a 12–2 tech-fall, resulting in a successful Olympic debut.  In the quarter-final, Uzbekistan's two-time Asian Champion, and Asian Games Champion, Bekzod Abdurakhmonov stood in the way; after a fairly competitive, Sidakov would be declared the winner with a 12–6 score; advancing Sidakov to the semi-final, opposite second seeded, Daniyar Kaisanov of Kazakhstan.  Sidakov would fairly easily dispatch of Kaisanov by a 11–0 tech-fall, resulting in an advancement into the 74 kg finals opposite former Russian, and now Belarusian representative, Magomedkhabib Kadimagomedov.  In the final against Kadimagomedov, Sidakov controlled ties and always had strong wrist control, which rendered Kadimagomed's strong over-hook offense useless and never afforded his opponent to get in a good shooting position; Sidakov would win by 7–0, accumulating one passivity point, a takedown, a cradle attempt and two push-outs to win the gold medal.

Freestyle record 

! colspan="7"| Freestyle matches
|-
!  Res.
!  Record
!  Opponent
!  Score
!  Date
!  Event
!  Location
|-
! style=background:white colspan=7 |
|-
|Win
|91–12
|align=left| David Baev
|style="font-size:88%"|3-1
|style="font-size:88%"|May 20, 2022
|style="font-size:88%"|Ivan Poddubny Wrestling League
|style="text-align:left;font-size:88%;"| Moscow, Russia
|-
|Win
|90–12
|align=left| Chermen Valiev
|style="font-size:88%"|4-0
|style="font-size:88%"|May 19, 2022
|style="font-size:88%"|Ivan Poddubny Wrestling League
|style="text-align:left;font-size:88%;"| Moscow, Russia
|-
|Win
|89–12
|align=left| Azamat Nurykau
|style="font-size:88%"|7-0
|style="font-size:88%"|May 19, 2022
|style="font-size:88%"|Ivan Poddubny Wrestling League
|style="text-align:left;font-size:88%;"| Moscow, Russia
|-
|Win
|88–12
|align=left| Magomedkhabib Kadimagomedov
|style="font-size:88%"|6–1
|style="font-size:88%"|December 3, 2021
|style="font-size:88%"|2021 Alrosa Cup
|style="text-align:left;font-size:88%;"| Moscow, Russia
|-
! style=background:white colspan=7 |
|-
|Win
|87–12
|align=left| Magomedkhabib Kadimagomedov
|style="font-size:88%"|7–0
|style="font-size:88%" rowspan=4|August 5–6, 2021
|style="font-size:88%" rowspan=4|2020 Summer Olympics
|style="text-align:left;font-size:88%;" rowspan=4|
 Tokyo, Japan
|-
|Win
|86–12
|align=left| Daniyar Kaisanov
|style="font-size:88%"|TF 11–0
|-
|Win
|85–12
|align=left| Bekzod Abdurakhmonov
|style="font-size:88%"|13–6
|-
|Win
|84–12
|align=left| Augusto Midana
|style="font-size:88%"|TF 12–2
|-
! style=background:white colspan=7 | 
|-
|Win
|83–12
|align=left| Jasmit Phulka
|style="font-size:88%"|TF 10–0
|style="font-size:88%" rowspan=3|June 18–19, 2021
|style="font-size:88%" rowspan=3|2021 Sassari City International
|style="text-align:left;font-size:88%;" rowspan=3|
 Sassari, Italy
|-
|Win
|82–12
|align=left| Andrew Azzopardi
|style="font-size:88%"|TF 11–0
|-
|Win
|81–12
|align=left| Augusto Midana
|style="font-size:88%"|Fall
|-
! style=background:white colspan=7 | 
|-
|Win
|80–12
|align=left| Razambek Zhamalov
|style="font-size:88%"|3–2
|style="font-size:88%" rowspan=5|March 11–12, 2021
|style="font-size:88%" rowspan=5|2021 Russian National Freestyle Wrestling Championships
|style="text-align:left;font-size:88%;" rowspan=5|
 Ulan-Ude, Russia
|-
|Win
|79–12
|align=left| Timur Bizhoev
|style="font-size:88%"|5–3
|-
|Win
|78–12
|align=left| Magomed Kurbanaliev
|style="font-size:88%"|5–3
|-
|Win
|77–12
|align=left| Darsam Dzhaparov
|style="font-size:88%"|4–0
|-
|Win
|76–12
|align=left| Buyan Tsyrenov
|style="font-size:88%"|Fall
|-
! style=background:white colspan=7 |
|-
|Win
|75–12
|align=left| Magomed Kurbanaliev
|style="font-size:88%"|9–1
|style="font-size:88%" rowspan=3|17 October 2020
|style="font-size:88%" rowspan=3|2020 Russian National Freestyle Wrestling Championships
|style="text-align:left;font-size:88%;" rowspan=3| Naro-Fominsk, Russia
|-
|Win
|74–12
|align=left| Azamat Khadzaragov
|style="font-size:88%"|TF 12–2
|-
|Loss
|73–12
|align=left| Khetag Tsabolov
|style="font-size:88%"|3–9
|-
! style=background:white colspan=7 |
|-
|Win
|73–11
|align=left| Frank Chamizo
|style="font-size:88%"|5–2
|style="font-size:88%" rowspan=5|20 September-21, 2019
|style="font-size:88%" rowspan=5|2019 World Wrestling Championships
|style="text-align:left;font-size:88%;" rowspan=5| Nur-Sultan, Kazakhstan
|-
|Win
|72–11
|align=left| Jordan Burroughs
|style="font-size:88%"|4–3
|-
|Win
|71–11
|align=left| Mao Okui
|style="font-size:88%"|6–0
|-
|Win
|70–11
|align=left| Kamil Rybicki
|style="font-size:88%"|8–0
|-
|Win
|69–11
|align=left| Victor Hernández
|style="font-size:88%"|TF 10–0
|-
|Win
|68–11
|align=left| Magomed Kurbanaliev
|style="font-size:88%"|2–1
|style="font-size:88%"|16 August 2019
|style="font-size:88%"|2019 Russian World Team Wrestle-offs
|style="text-align:left;font-size:88%;"|
 Sochi, Russia
|-
! style=background:white colspan=7 |
|-
|Win
|67–11
|align=left| Soner Demirtaş
|style="font-size:88%"|Fall
|style="font-size:88%" rowspan=3|25 June-26, 2019
|style="font-size:88%" rowspan=3|2019 European Games
|style="text-align:left;font-size:88%;" rowspan=3| Minsk, Belarus
|-
|Win
|66–11
|align=left| Azamat Nurykau
|style="font-size:88%"|6–4
|-
|Win
|65–11
|align=left| Avtandil Kentchadze
|style="font-size:88%"|5–3
|-
! style=background:white colspan=7 |
|-
|Win
|64–11
|align=left| Reza Afzali
|style="font-size:88%"|6–0
|style="font-size:88%" rowspan=2|16 March-17, 2019
|style="font-size:88%" rowspan=2|2019 Wrestling World Cup
|style="text-align:left;font-size:88%;" rowspan=2| Yakutsk, Russia
|-
|Win
|63–11
|align=left| Geandry Garzón
|style="font-size:88%"|Fall
|-
! style=background:white colspan=7 |
|-
|Win
|62–11
|align=left| Yakup Gör
|style="font-size:88%"|5–4
|style="font-size:88%" rowspan=4|24 January-27, 2019
|style="font-size:88%" rowspan=4|Golden Grand Prix Ivan Yarygin 2019
|style="text-align:left;font-size:88%;" rowspan=4| Krasnoyarsk, Russia
|-
|Win
|61–11
|align=left| Azamat Nurykau
|style="font-size:88%"|7–1
|-
|Win
|60–11
|align=left| Timur Bizhoev
|style="font-size:88%"|2–2
|-
|Win
|59–11
|align=left| Ken Hosaka
|style="font-size:88%"|TF 12–1
|-
! style=background:white colspan=7 |
|-
|Win
|58–11
|align=left| Avtandil Kentchadze
|style="font-size:88%"|2–2
|style="font-size:88%" rowspan=5|20 October-21, 2018
|style="font-size:88%" rowspan=5|2018 World Wrestling Championships
|style="text-align:left;font-size:88%;" rowspan=5| Budapest, Hungary
|-
|Win
|57–11
|align=left| Frank Chamizo
|style="font-size:88%"|3–2
|-
|Win
|56–11
|align=left| Jordan Burroughs
|style="font-size:88%"|6–5
|-
|Win
|55–11
|align=left| Franklin Gómez
|style="font-size:88%"|6–0
|-
|Win
|54–11
|align=left| Miroslav Kirov
|style="font-size:88%"|TF 10–0
|-
! style=background:white colspan=7 |
|-
|Win
|53–11
|align=left| Khetag Tsabolov
|style="font-size:88%"|2–2
|style="font-size:88%" rowspan=3|3 August-5, 2018
|style="font-size:88%" rowspan=3|2018 Russian National Freestyle Wrestling Championships
|style="text-align:left;font-size:88%;" rowspan=3| Odintsovo, Russia
|-
|Win
|52–11
|align=left| Evgeny Lapshov
|style="font-size:88%"|TF 10–0
|-
|Win
|51–11
|align=left| Timur Bizhoev 
|style="font-size:88%"|3–1
|-
! style=background:white colspan=7 |
|-
|Win
|50–11
|align=left| Akhsarbek Gulaev
|style="font-size:88%"|3–1
|style="font-size:88%" rowspan=4|4 June-10, 2018
|style="font-size:88%" rowspan=4|2018 European U23 Wrestling Championship
|style="text-align:left;font-size:88%;" rowspan=4| Istanbul, Turkey
|-
|Win
|49–11
|align=left| Avtandil Kentchadze
|style="font-size:88%"|TF 12–1
|-
|Win
|48–11
|align=left| Johann Steinforth
|style="font-size:88%"|7–0
|-
|Win
|47–11
|align=left| Dzhemal Rushen Ali 
|style="font-size:88%"|TF 11–0
|-
! style=background:white colspan=7 |
|-
|Win
|46–11
|align=left| Hamed Rashidi
|style="font-size:88%"|11–3
|style="font-size:88%" rowspan=3|14 May-20, 2018
|style="font-size:88%" rowspan=3|2018 World Military Championships
|style="text-align:left;font-size:88%;" rowspan=3| Moscow, Russia
|-
|Win
|45–11
|align=left| Baibolsyn Kurmanbekov
|style="font-size:88%"|TF 11–0
|-
|Win
|44–11
|align=left| Johann Steinforth 
|style="font-size:88%"|TF 11–0
|-
! style=background:white colspan=7 |
|-
|Loss
|43–11
|align=left| Khetag Tsabolov
|style="font-size:88%"|1–3
|style="font-size:88%" rowspan=3|28 January 2018
|style="font-size:88%" rowspan=3|Golden Grand Prix Ivan Yarygin 2018
|style="text-align:left;font-size:88%;" rowspan=3| Krasnoyarsk, Russia
|-
|Win
|43–10
|align=left| Kakhaber Khubezhty
|style="font-size:88%"|5–0
|-
|Win
|42–10
|align=left| Muhammet Akdeniz
|style="font-size:88%"|TF 13–2
|-
! style=background:white colspan=7 |
|-
|Loss
|41–10
|align=left| Magomed Kurbanaliev
|style="font-size:88%"|5–7
|style="font-size:88%" rowspan=4|17 November-19, 2017
|style="font-size:88%" rowspan=4|2017 Alany Cup
|style="text-align:left;font-size:88%;" rowspan=4| Vladikavkaz, Russia
|-
|Win
|41–9
|align=left| Frank Chamizo
|style="font-size:88%"|9–6
|-
|Win
|40–9
|align=left| Shmagi Todua
|style="font-size:88%"|TF 10–0
|-
|Win
|39–9
|align=left| Miroslav Kirov 
|style="font-size:88%"|TF 10–0
|-
! style=background:white colspan=7 |
|-
|Win
|38–9
|align=left| Murtazali Muslimov
|style="font-size:88%"|Points
|style="font-size:88%" rowspan=3|9 November-13, 2017
|style="font-size:88%" rowspan=3|2017 Alrosa Cup
|style="text-align:left;font-size:88%;" rowspan=3| Moscow, Russia
|-
|Win
|37–9
|align=left| Dmitri Malencov
|style="font-size:88%"|TF
|-
|Win
|36–9
|align=left| Levan Kelekhsashvili
|style="font-size:88%"|Points
|-
! style=background:white colspan=7 |
|-
|Loss
|35–9
|align=left| Israil Kasumov
|style="font-size:88%"|4–5
|style="font-size:88%" rowspan=3|28 October-29, 2017
|style="font-size:88%" rowspan=3|2017 Prix of Vladimir Semenov "Yugra Cup"
|style="text-align:left;font-size:88%;" rowspan=3| Nefteyugansk, Russia
|-
|Win
|35–8
|align=left| Anzor Zakuev
|style="font-size:88%"|11–6
|-
|Win
|34–8
|align=left| Ramazan Archikhanov
|style="font-size:88%"|10–4
|-
! style=background:white colspan=7 |
|-
|Win
|33–8
|align=left| Konstantine Khabalashvili
|style="font-size:88%"|TF 10–0
|style="font-size:88%" rowspan=4|7 October-8, 2017
|style="font-size:88%" rowspan=4|2017 Stepan Sargsyan Cup
|style="text-align:left;font-size:88%;" rowspan=4| Vanadzor, Armenia
|-
|Win
|32–8
|align=left| Omari Gurjidze
|style="font-size:88%"|TF 10–0
|-
|Win
|31–8
|align=left| Giorgi Sanodze
|style="font-size:88%"|Fall
|-
|Win
|30–8
|align=left| Arsen Tomaev
|style="font-size:88%"|TF 11–0
|-
! style=background:white colspan=7 |
|-
|Loss
|29–8
|align=left| Gadjimurad Omarov
|style="font-size:88%"|1–1
|style="font-size:88%" rowspan=4|28 March – 2 April 2017
|style="font-size:88%" rowspan=4|2017 U23 European Championships
|style="text-align:left;font-size:88%;" rowspan=4| Szombathely, Hungary
|-
|Win
|29–7
|align=left| Muhammet Akdeniz
|style="font-size:88%"|TF 13–3
|-
|Win
|28–7
|align=left| Vasyl Mykhailov
|style="font-size:88%"|11–2
|-
|Win
|27–7
|align=left| Alberts Jurcenko
|style="font-size:88%"|TF 11–0
|-
! style=background:white colspan=7 |
|-
|Loss
|26–7
|align=left| Israil Kasumov
|style="font-size:88%"|2–5
|style="font-size:88%" rowspan=5|27 January-29, 2017
|style="font-size:88%" rowspan=5|Golden Grand Prix Ivan Yarygin 2017
|style="text-align:left;font-size:88%;" rowspan=5| Krasnoyarsk, Russia
|-
|Win
|26–6
|align=left| Magomedkhabib Kadimagomedov
|style="font-size:88%"|9–7
|-
|Win
|25–6
|align=left| Timur Bizhoev
|style="font-size:88%"|3–1
|-
|Win
|24–6
|align=left| Timur Nikolaev
|style="font-size:88%"|3–0
|-
|Win
|23–6
|align=left| Rasul Dzhukayev
|style="font-size:88%"|5–0
|-
! style=background:white colspan=7 |
|-
|Win
|22–6
|align=left| Radik Valiev
|style="font-size:88%"|4–2
|style="font-size:88%" rowspan=4|27 May 2016
|style="font-size:88%" rowspan=4|2016 Russian National Freestyle Wrestling Championships
|style="text-align:left;font-size:88%;" rowspan=4| Yakutsk, Russia
|-
|Win
|21–6
|align=left| Ildus Giniatullin
|style="font-size:88%"|TF 12–0
|-
|Win
|20–6
|align=left| Yevgeny Zherbaev
|style="font-size:88%"|12–3
|-
|Win
|19–6
|align=left| Khabib Magomedov
|style="font-size:88%"|7–2
|-
! style=background:white colspan=7 |
|-
|Loss
|18–6
|align=left| Azamat Nurykau
|style="font-size:88%"|7–9
|style="font-size:88%" rowspan=4|11 March 2016
|style="font-size:88%" rowspan=4|2016 European Wrestling Championships
|style="text-align:left;font-size:88%;" rowspan=4| Riga, Latvia
|-
|Win
|18–5
|align=left| David Safaryan
|style="font-size:88%"|9–4
|-
|Win
|17–5
|align=left| Muhammed Ilkhan
|style="font-size:88%"|4–2
|-
|Loss
|16–5
|align=left| Magomedmurad Gadzhiev
|style="font-size:88%"|4–4
|-
! style=background:white colspan=7 |
|-
|Win
|16–4
|align=left| Khusey Suyunchev
|style="font-size:88%"|2–2
|style="font-size:88%" rowspan=5|27 January-29, 2016
|style="font-size:88%" rowspan=5|Golden Grand Prix Ivan Yarygin 2016
|style="text-align:left;font-size:88%;" rowspan=5| Krasnoyarsk, Russia
|-
|Win
|15–4
|align=left| Atsamaz Sanakoev
|style="font-size:88%"|1–1
|-
|Win
|14–4
|align=left| Kamal Malikov
|style="font-size:88%"|6–4
|-
|Win
|13–4
|align=left| Alibek Akbaev
|style="font-size:88%"|9–2
|-
|Win
|12–4
|align=left| Buyanjavyn Batzorig
|style="font-size:88%"|10–1
|-
! style=background:white colspan=7 |
|-
|Win
|11–4
|align=left| Andreas Triantafyllidis
|style="font-size:88%"|8–0
|style="font-size:88%" rowspan=4|16 May-17, 2015
|style="font-size:88%" rowspan=4|2015 Olympia
|style="text-align:left;font-size:88%;" rowspan=4| Olympia, Greece
|-
|Win
|10–4
|align=left| V. Longs
|style="font-size:88%"|TF 11–0
|-
|Win
|9–4
|align=left| Mihai Sava
|style="font-size:88%"|10–4
|-
|Win
|8–4
|align=left| Vilson Ndregjoni
|style="font-size:88%"|TF 10–0
|-
! style=background:white colspan=7 |
|-
|Loss
|7–4
|align=left| Magomed Muslimov
|style="font-size:88%"|0–6
|style="font-size:88%" rowspan=3|11 April-12, 2015
|style="font-size:88%" rowspan=3|2015 World Wrestling Cup
|style="text-align:left;font-size:88%;" rowspan=3| Los Angeles, California
|-
|Loss
|7–3
|align=left| Franklin Maren
|style="font-size:88%"|3–4
|-
|Loss
|7–2
|align=left| Ganzorigiin Mandakhnaran
|style="font-size:88%"|4–6
|-
! style=background:white colspan=7 |
|-
|Win
|7–1
|align=left| Alibeggadzhi Emeev
|style="font-size:88%"|3–2
|style="font-size:88%" rowspan=5|22 January-26, 2015
|style="font-size:88%" rowspan=5|Golden Grand Prix Ivan Yarygin 2015
|style="text-align:left;font-size:88%;" rowspan=5| Krasnoyarsk, Russia
|-
|Win
|6–1
|align=left| Viktor Stepanov
|style="font-size:88%"|11–8
|-
|Loss
|5–1
|align=left| Brent Metcalf
|style="font-size:88%"|1–9
|-
|Win
|5–0
|align=left| Meirzhan Ashirov
|style="font-size:88%"|7–6
|-
|Win
|4–0
|align=left| Khalil Kupeli
|style="font-size:88%"|TF 11–0
|-
! style=background:white colspan=7 |
|-
|Win
|3–0
|align=left| Shiksaid Dzhalilov
|style="font-size:88%"|2–1
|style="font-size:88%" rowspan=3|28 November-30, 2014
|style="font-size:88%" rowspan=3|2014 Brazil Cup
|style="text-align:left;font-size:88%;" rowspan=3| Rio de Janeiro, Brazil
|-
|Win
|2–0
|align=left| Kotaro Tanaka
|style="font-size:88%"|10–2
|-
|Win
|1–0
|align=left| Sixto Pedragas
|style="font-size:88%"|TF 10–0
|-

References

External links
 

Russian wrestlers
1996 births
Living people
People from Surgut
Russian people of Ossetian descent
Russian male sport wrestlers
World Wrestling Championships medalists
European Games gold medalists for Russia
Wrestlers at the 2019 European Games
European Games medalists in wrestling
Wrestlers at the 2020 Summer Olympics
Olympic medalists in wrestling
Medalists at the 2020 Summer Olympics
Olympic gold medalists for the Russian Olympic Committee athletes
Survivors of terrorist attacks
Olympic wrestlers of Russia